Cecilia Bannerman is a Ghanaian politician and a former Minister of State. She served as the sector minister for Manpower Development and Employment from 2001 to 2003 and Minister of Mines between 2003 and 2005. In 2009 she was appointed to serve as a member of the Council of State.

References

Living people
New Patriotic Party politicians
Year of birth missing (living people)